The Subaru 1000 is the first and only front wheel drive Subaru produced by Fuji Heavy Industries that was in the Japanese government "compact car" classification starting in 1966. Previous Subaru models such as the Subaru 360 and the Sambar had been rear-engined, rear wheel drive kei cars.

It was the first production Subaru to use a boxer engine, and one of Japan's first front wheel drive cars.

History

Prototype Subaru A-5
In 1962, Subaru management decided to introduce a successor to the prototype Subaru 1500 with a code name A-5. The engine was technologically advanced for the time; the experimental EA51X was a Otto cycle, overhead camshaft, air-cooled, horizontally opposed four-cylinder engine displacing 980 cc driving the front wheels in a compact car platform. It was to have a double wishbone front suspension. Due to FHI's limited resources, the car was not produced. The Subaru 360 was selling only in Japan at the time but Subaru wanted a car that could comfortably carry four passengers without a cramped compartment, that was an alternative to rear wheel drive competitors Toyota Corolla, Nissan Sunny, Mazda Familia, Hino Contessa, Isuzu Bellett, and the Mitsubishi Colt 1000. Subaru also wanted to reduce engine noise by placing the engine at the front and improve interior space by implementing front wheel drive, thereby eliminating a centrally mounted drive shaft powering the rear wheels, and utilizing an independent suspension at all four wheels. Installing the air-cooled engine in the front took advantage of additional airflow into the engine compartment while the vehicle was in motion, while other air-cooled vehicles directed airflow into the rear engine compartment using externally installed air scoops to aid in cooling. To maximize space for front seat passengers, a bench seat was used and the transmission used a steering column attached gearlever. The only other Japanese company to use an air-cooled, horizontally opposed engine at the time was in the Toyota Publica with the Toyota U engine. Its appearance is similar to the Citroën Ami sharing an unusual reverse-raked notchback rear window, similar in style to the 1959 Ford Anglia 105E in Great Britain, and turn signal lamps installed next to the rear window as well as an air cooled flat 4 engine.

Production model
The model was put into production; it was assigned production code A-63 and was eventually introduced as the Subaru 1000. For compactness and to ensure quietness of operation with vibration kept to a minimum, the engine was developed with water cooling instead of the originally intended air cooling in the A-5 concept.

The Subaru 1000 was formally introduced on October 21, 1965, at the Hilton Hotel Tokyo, now known as the Hotel Tokyu Capitol. It was shown at the 12th Tokyo Motor Show Sunday October 29 later that year. It was available for purchase May 14, 1966 with a national release in Japan in October 1966. Its model code was A522. The two-door sedan, model A512 was introduced February 15, 1967, with a four-door van released September 14, 1967.

These cars featured a unique water-cooled, horizontally opposed four-cylinder engine, with overhead valves operated by pushrods. Subaru engineers examined designs by Porsche, Renault, DKW and the Chevrolet Corvair, and concluded that it would be desirable to combine this type of engine with a front wheel drive system. The main problem in achieving this combination was the vibrations from universal joints, but in collaboration with the bearing maker Toyo Bearing (now known as NTN), the innovative "double offset joint" was devised. Modern Subarus still make use of horizontally opposed four-cylinder engines, albeit of a much greater capacity and with more modern overhead-cam-driven valves.

As was typical of early front wheel drive cars, the 1000 featured inboard drum brakes up front to reduce unsprung suspension weight and an easier implementation of an independent front suspension (but atypically Subaru would retain this unusual design into the seventies). Other unique features of the 1000 were a lack of a heater core, the heating system took its warmth directly from the radiator, and a hybrid suspension system that used torsion bars in combination with coil springs (much like the front suspension of the Subaru 360).

In addition to the  model there was also a more powerful "1000 SS" model available for 1968, first shown at the 1967 Tokyo Motor Show. The power increase was due to twin SU carburettors and a 10:1 compression ratio, while stopping and going was improved with the fitment of quicker steering, disc brakes in front, firmer suspension, and standard radial tires. The 1000 was superseded by the 1100 (also known as the Subaru FF-1 Star in the United States and in other export markets) at the start of the seventies.

By March 1969, Subaru had produced over 4,000 units as an alternative to the Toyota Corolla series KE10 (introduced in 1966), and the Nissan Sunny series B10.

Engine

Subaru EA-52 Engine 1.0L OHV water-cooled flat-four
Displacement:  x , 977.2 cc
Power:  at 6000 rpm,  at 3200 rpm with 9:1 compression ratio and two-barrel carburetor

Transmission
Four-speed manual, front-wheel drive
Gear ratios: 1st 4.000 2nd 2.235 3rd 1.543 4th 1.033, Rev 4.100 Final 4.125

FF-1 Star (1970-1973)

The, known also as the FF-1 Star, was a development of the original front wheel drive Subaru, the 1000. The FF-1 was introduced in Japan March 1, 1969, and was marketed as the Star in the United States in 1970 and 1971 model years. It was replaced by the FF-1 G in 1971. Coupe, sedan, and station wagon models were available.  This model only came with the EA-61 engine and four-speed manual transmission. The FF-1 can be distinguished from the 1000 by minor trim modifications to include the front grille and interior appearance.

Engine
Subaru EA-61, 1.1 L OHV water-cooled flat-4
Displacement:  x , 1088 cc
Power:  at 5600 rpm,  at 4000 rpm with 9:1 compression ratio and two-barrel carburetor

Transmission
Four-speed manual. Gear ratios: 1st 3.540 (4.000 wagon), 2nd 2.235, 3rd 1.543, 4th 1.033, Rev 4.100, Final 4.125

FF-1 1300G (1971-1972)

The (also known as the 1100 and 1300) was a compact car and introduced in Japan July 10, 1970, replacing the FF-1 Star.  It was a front wheel drive vehicle with a typical Subaru EA61 or EA62 flat-4 engine.  A fully independent torsion bar suspension and rack and pinion steering were impressive for the time.  The inboard front drum brakes were an oddity.  Also strange were the dual radiators - the car used only a small radiator (which was also the heater core) on starting, hastening warmup.  Even in 1972, Subaru boasted about the foul-weather handling of their cars, and they were quite successful.  Priced at just over USD $2,000 equal to $ today and achieving , the Subaru quickly became a strong-selling import car in the United States.

In 1970, a Subaru dealership received a special order request from the Tohoku Electric Power Company for Subaru to build an all-weather vehicle with 4WD, as the company was currently using jeeps that were open to the weather. The jeeps could not seal out the cold weather, and did not have adequate heaters for winter use. The 4WD traction was advantageous in traveling on poor roads, but the jeeps were of a 30-year-old design and something more modern was desired. A car with 4WD would be more comfortable. Tohoku Electric asked that the Subaru 1000 station wagon be converted from front-wheel drive to 4WD. Given the design of the drivetrain being used in Subarus of the time, it was considered relatively easy to simply attach a driveshaft to the back of the transmission and add a rear differential that powered the rear wheels. A transfer case was also installed so that the 4WD system could be disengaged with an additional gearshift lever installed next to the transmission gearshift.

In March 1971, two prototypes were used in testing a 4WD system using the station-wagon body style, borrowing a rear differential from a Nissan Bluebird 510 series. The tests were successful. On October 29, 1971, the Subaru 1300G was displayed next to a station wagon installed with 4WD, parked on top of a mirror so that visitors to the 18th Tokyo Motor Show could see the new drivetrain system. The station wagon also had a  increased ground clearance over the standard model displayed. Subaru manufactured eight wagons with the 4WD installed, which Tohoku Electric purchased five and the remaining three were delivered to the Village of Hakuba for government use in Nagano Prefecture in agricultural applications.

In 2008, Subaru located one of the original eight wagons. The vehicle was restored to its original condition and is displayed at various events in Japan.

This platform of sedans and wagons was discontinued by Subaru on September 1 1972, and replaced by the all new Subaru Leone.

Engines

The 1.1L EA61 and 1.3L EA62 engines had no cooling fan, only an electric fan on the small radiator cooled the engine.  The 1.1L was shared with the Subaru FF-1 Star, however the 1.3L engine was unique to this model and the only Subaru engine to have rear-facing exhaust ports.  Most 1972-1973 models were equipped with the 1.3L EA62 engine and dual carburetors was an available factory option.  The transmission was also borrowed from the Subaru FF-1 Star.

EA61 1.1L OHV Water-Cooled Flat-4
Displacement: 76 mm x 60 mm, 1088 cc
Power:  at 5600 rpm,  at 4000 rpm with 9:1 compression and two barrel carburetor

EA62 1.3L OHV Water-Cooled Flat-4
Displacement: 82 mm x 60 mm, 1268 cc
Power:  at 6400 rpm,  at 4000 rpm with 9:1 compression and dual two barrel carburetors

Transmission
Subaru T71 Four-Speed Manual, Front-Wheel Drive 
Gear Ratios: 1st 3.540 2nd 2.235 3rd 1.543 4th 1.033, Rev 4.100 Final 4.125

References

 Subaru FF-1 History
 1971 Subaru Sales Brochure
 Vintage Subaru Engine ID
 Subaru Engine Details
 1972 Subaru Sales Brochure

1000
Cars powered by boxer engines
Cars introduced in 1966
Station wagons